The Tympanophorinae is a subfamily of bush-crickets, sometimes called balloon-winged bush-crickets, found in Australia.

Genera
There is one extinct and one extant genus:
 †Eomortoniellus Zeuner, 1936
 Tympanophora White, 1841

References

External links
 
 

Orthoptera subfamilies
Orthoptera of Australia
Tettigoniidae